Naim Allaj (born 30 November 1950) is an Albanian retired international footballer who played as a midfielder. He played for Besa Kavajë in the Albanian Superliga.

International career
Allaj made his debut for Albania in a 1974 FIFA World Cup qualification match against Finland. His other cap was earned in a November 1973 friendly against China.

References

External links
 

1950 births
Living people
Footballers from Kavajë
Albanian footballers
Association football midfielders
Besa Kavajë players
Kategoria Superiore players
Albania international footballers